Carlo Sanchez is an American politician who served as a Delegate to the Maryland General Assembly representing Maryland's 47th Legislative District in northwestern Prince George's County from 2015 to 2019.

Personal life 
Sanchez' parents moved to the United States from El Salvador, settling in Langley Park, Maryland, where Sanchez was born on April 1, 1982. He attended Takoma Academy, a Seventh-day Adventist school in Takoma Park, Maryland before earning an associate degree from Montgomery College and a bachelor's degree from the University of Maryland, College Park. He has worked as a public safety training officer for Montgomery College since 2000. He is an elder with the Washington Spanish Seventh-day Adventist Church, and his wife works as an operating room nurse.

Political career 
Sanchez began volunteering for future United States Senator Chris Van Hollen while still a student at Montgomery College during Van Hollen's 2002 campaign for Maryland's 8th Congressional District. After the conclusion of the campaign, Sanchez began to volunteer on other political campaigns. In 2010, he became involved in the Prince George's County Young Democrats, and by 2014 had been elected to the countywide Democratic Central Committee and as President of his neighborhood association. In 2015, following the resignation of Delegate Will Campos, Sanchez ran for the appointment to the open seat representing the heavily Hispanic District 47B. He was unopposed for the appointment and gained the support from District 47 Senator Victor R. Ramirez. He was sworn into the House of Delegates on October 30, 2015.

In the Legislature 
Sanchez was appointed to serve as a member of the House Judiciary Committee, which oversees legislation affecting civil and criminal law, upon joining the House of Delegates. In 2017, he was elected Chair of the Maryland Legislative Latino Caucus.

Sanchez was defeated for election to his seat in the 2018 Democratic primary by Wanika B. Fisher, the eventual winner in the general election.

Post-politics 
In 2022, Sanchez was appointed to the Prince George's County Police Accountability Board.

References 

1982 births
American politicians of Salvadoran descent
Hispanic and Latino American state legislators in Maryland
Living people
Democratic Party members of the Maryland House of Delegates
Salvadoran emigrants to the United States
21st-century American politicians
People from Langley Park, Maryland